Enerpac is a business is a division of Enerpac Tool Group (NYSE: EPAC) a $1.5 billion diversified global manufacturing company of industrial tools, and is headquartered in Menomonee Falls, Wisconsin. Enerpac primarily plays in the high-pressure hydraulics market with locations in North and South America, Europe, United kingdom, Africa, Russia, the Middle East, Asia, Australia, and New Zealand. The business has over 30 offices in 22 different countries and over 1,000 employees. Enerpac produces and globally distributes high-pressure hydraulic products and industrial tools, such as controlled bolting tools, portable machine equipment and flange working tools. The business focuses on the design of products, from small cylinders to computer-operated lifting & positioning systems.

History

Timeline
Historian John Gurda authored "The Drive To Lead," a history of Actuant, that highlights important events in Enerpac's history. 
1910: American Grinder Manufacturing Co. incorporates
1918: American Grinder Manufacturing Co. produces water pumps for Ford’s ‘Model T’ motor car
1925: American Grinder’s name is changed to Blackhawk Manufacturing
1927: Blackhawk buys Hydraulic Tool Co. of Los Angeles
1959: Enerpac is founded with brand name formally adopted for hydraulic tools and systems
1961: Blackhawk Manufacturing becomes Applied Power Industries
1980s: Enerpac creates convertible top actuation system
1985: Applied Power increases global presence with 10 plants on 5 continents
2000: APW Electronics spins off from Applied Power; Enerpac business becomes part of Actuant Corporation
2000: Enerpac system raises Golden Gate Bridge
2004: Athens Olympic Stadium's suspended arched roof constructed with Enerpac supports
2005: Millau Viaduct bridge in France is supported with Enerpac hydraulic lifting systems
2006: Enerpac:
-Lifts and moves the 74-year-old Shanghai Concert Hall
-Places roof on the "Bird’s Nest" or the Beijing National Stadium where the 2008 Olympics were located.
-Repairs Milwaukee Brewers Major League Baseball stadium’s moveable roof at Miller Park
2009: Stage for the “U2 360° Tour” is constructed using Enerpac’s Synchronous Lift System
2010: Enerpac hydraulics play role in latest construction of San Francisco Bay Bridge
JS500 used to Undeck an Electric Rope Shovel in a Copper Mine
Safely Erected a Bridge Over Water with a Hydraulic Driven Launching Nose
16-point EVO Synchronous Lifting System, CLRG-Series Double-Acting Hydraulic Jacks lifted a historic building

Products and Services
Enerpac is a manufacturer of high-force tools and components for a variety of markets and applications. Enerpac has six key product focuses which include:
Industrial Tools: Hydraulic pumps, cylinders, valves and system components
Bolting: Hydraulic torque wrenches, tensioners and multipliers
Heavy Lifting Technology: Solutions tailored for specific heavy lifting applications
Workholding: Hydraulic clamping and fixture components for the machine tool industry
Unilift: Mechanical Actuators and system components
Concrete Stressing: Stressing jacks, and pumps

Heavy Lifting Technology
Enerpac's Heavy Lifting Technology business provides custom hydraulic solutions for the controlled movement and positioning of structures. Enerpac combines hydraulics, steel fabrication, and electronic control with engineering and application knowledge, in design and manufacturing.
Telescopic Hydraulic Gantry Systems
Strand Jacks
Skidding Systems
Self Propelled Modular Trailer
Synchronous Lifting System
Custom Solutions

Markets Served
Infrastructure and Bridges
Power Generation
Oil and Gas
Mining
Shipbuilding
Buildings and Stadiums
Petrochemical
Manufacturing
Steel Production and Metal Production

References

External links
 Enerpac's website
 Actuant Corporation

Manufacturing companies based in Wisconsin